Dome Kwabenya  is one of the constituencies represented in the Parliament of Ghana. It elects one Member of Parliament (MP) by the first past the post system of election. Dome Kwabenya is located in the Ga East district  of the Greater Accra Region of Ghana.

Boundaries
The seat is located within the Ga East District of the Greater Accra Region of Ghana. It was formed prior to the 2004 December presidential and parliamentary elections by carving the new Dome Kwabenya out of the Abokobi-Madina constituencies.

Members of Parliament

Elections

See also
List of Ghana Parliament constituencies

References  

Parliamentary constituencies in the Greater Accra Region